Athénée Royal Serge Creuz (ARSC) is a French-language secondary school (Atheneum) in Sint-Jans-Molenbeek, Brussels, Belgium. It is supported by the French Community of Belgium. There are five locations: Fondamental Prospérité, Fondamental Sippelberg, Secondaire Prospérité , Secondaire Sippelberg, and Secondaire Ch. de Gand.

 Fabrice Vanbockestal was the headmaster.

History

In 2006 a group of students rescued a 29-year old teacher from a beating that occurred shortly after he left school.

In 2013 the director of the implantation II basic section was dismissed.

References

External links

 Athénée Royal Serge Creuz 

Molenbeek-Saint-Jean
Secondary schools in Brussels